Just a Little More Love is the debut studio album by David Guetta, released on  by Virgin and Gum Prod. The album uses two main vocalists, Chris Willis and Barbara Tucker. The title track, "Just a Little More Love", was recorded in only thirty minutes.  It was later remixed by Wally López and subsequently featured on MoS: Clubbers Guide 2004 and in the soundtrack to The Football Factory. Four singles were released from the album: "Just a Little More Love", "Love Don't Let Me Go", "People Come People Go" and "Give Me Something". "Love Don't Let Me Go" was re-released in 2006 as a remix with funk band The Egg.  The title track also was the first music video for David Guetta, produced by Gum Prod. and featuring Parisian models such as Donny Lewis.

Commercial performance
Just a Little More Love has sold more than 300,000 copies worldwide. It has sales of 4,500 units in the United States, according to Nielsen SoundScan. The album debuted at number 11 in France, before making its peak position of number 6 the next three weeks. The album ended at number 143 after 27 more weeks on the chart. The album made its peak position of number 17 in Switzerland, where it charted for 28 weeks. The album peaked at number 43 in Wallonia, only charting for 2 weeks.

Critical reception

Just a Little More Love has been positively received. David Jeffries of Allmusic called it a "breezy and slick album Stardust never recorded," awarding it 3 out of 5 stars.

Track listing
All tracks produced by David Guetta and Joachim Garraud. Post-production and remix on "You" by Pierre Hinard and Maxime Desprez.

Charts

Weekly charts

Year-end charts

Certifications

References

2002 debut albums
David Guetta albums
Albums produced by David Guetta